2-Amino-3-carboxymuconic semialdehyde is an intermediate in the metabolism of tryptophan in the tryptophan-niacin catabolic pathway. Quinolinate is a neurotoxin formed nonenzymatically from 2-amino-3-carboxymuconic semialdehyde in mammalian tissues. 2-Amino-3-carboxymuconic semialdehyde is enzymatically converted to 2-aminomuconate via 2-aminomuconic semialdehyde.

References

Amino acids
Conjugated aldehydes
Dicarboxylic acids
Enoic acids